Sinarella is a genus of moths of the family Erebidae. The genus was erected by Felix Bryk in 1949.

Species
Sinarella aegrota (Butler, 1879) Japan, Korea, China, Ussuri
Sinarella albeola (Rothschild, 1915) New Guinea, Seram, Sulawesi, Borneo
Sinarella c-album Owada Japan
Sinarella cristulalis (Staudinger, 1892) south-eastern Siberia
Sinarella discisigna (Moore, 1883) northern India, Nepal, Thailand
Sinarella griseola Holloway, 2008 Borneo
Sinarella itoi Owada, 1987 Japan
Sinarella japonica (Butler, 1881) Japan, Ussuri
Sinarella lunifera (Moore, [1885]) Ceylon, Japan
Sinarella nigrisigna (Leech, 1900) Japan, China, Taiwan
Sinarella punctalis (Herz, 1904) Japan, Korea, Ussuri
Sinarella rotundipennis Owada, 1982 Japan

References

Herminiinae